The 2016–17 Cal State Northridge Matadors men's basketball team represented California State University, Northridge (also known as CSUN) during the 2016–17 NCAA Division I men's basketball season. The Matadors, led by fourth-year head coach Reggie Theus, played their home games at the Matadome as members of the Big West Conference. They finished the season 11–19, 7–9 in Big West play to finish in sixth place. In the Big West tournament, they lost to Cal State Fullerton in the quarterfinals.

Previous season
The Matadors finished the 2015–16 season 10–20, 5–11 in Big West play to finish in a tie for sixth place. Due to "serious violations" in the basketball program, the school self-imposed a postseason ban.

Offseason

Departures

Incoming transfers

2016 incoming recruits

Roster

Schedule and results

|-
!colspan=9 style=| Exhibition

|-
!colspan=9 style=| Non-conference regular season

|-
!colspan=9 style=| Big West regular season

|-
!colspan=9 style=|Big West tournament

References

Cal State Northridge Matadors men's basketball seasons
Cal State Northridge